Henrique Callado (12 June 1920 – 12 November 2001) was a Portuguese equestrian. He competed in five consecutive Olympic Games, starting with the 1948 Summer Olympics, and finishing with the 1964 Summer Olympics.

References

External links
 

1920 births
2001 deaths
Portuguese male equestrians
Olympic equestrians of Portugal
Equestrians at the 1948 Summer Olympics
Equestrians at the 1952 Summer Olympics
Equestrians at the 1956 Summer Olympics
Equestrians at the 1960 Summer Olympics
Equestrians at the 1964 Summer Olympics
People from Bragança, Portugal
Sportspeople from Bragança District